Kärnä is a Finnish surname. Notable people with the surname include:

 Jarmo Kärnä (born 1958), Finnish long jumper
 Mikko Kärnä (born 1980), Finnish politician
 Sari Kärnä (born 1988), Finnish ice hockey player

Finnish-language surnames